Mohammed Ebrahim Ali Ayash (born on 6 March 1986), is a Yemeni football player who plays as a goalkeeper for Peshmerga.

International career
He debuted for the Yemeni under-17 national team, appearing in the 2003 FIFA U-17 World Championship in Finland.

In 2019 he participated at the AFC Asian Cup Finals.

References

External links

1986 births
Living people
Yemeni footballers
Yemeni expatriate footballers
Yemen international footballers
Association football goalkeepers
Yemeni expatriate sportspeople in Oman
Yemeni expatriate sportspeople in Iraq
Expatriate footballers in Oman
Expatriate footballers in Iraq
Al-Hilal Al-Sahili players
Suwaiq Club players
Yemeni League players
Oman Professional League players
2019 AFC Asian Cup players